The Lonely Shepherd, also known as Einsamer Hirte or Der einsame Hirte in German or as El pastor solitario in Spanish, is an instrumental piece by James Last, first released in a recording with the Romanian panflutist Gheorghe Zamfir.

Background
Originally, the title was planned for the album Filmmusik ohne Filme, which was only to contain original compositions by James Last. This album was never released, so "The Lonely Shepherd " was published on Last's 1977 album Russland Erinnerungen (Memories of Russia). In the same year, it was also released as a single, which reached 22nd on the music charts in Germany. With this recording, Gheorghe Zamfir, who had already published a number of records, succeeded in an international breakthrough. Among other things, he accompanied James Last in his 1978 tour.

"The Lonely Shepherd" has repeatedly been used as soundtrack. In 1979, it was used as the title theme for the six-part television series Golden Soak (Das Gold der Wüste). In 1983 it was used as the love theme of a Venezuelan series called "Chao, Cristina" produced by the Venezuelan TV network RCTV and again in 1984 in the Oscar-nominated animated short film "Paradise". In 2003, Quentin Tarantino used the recording as soundtrack in a scene and in the closing credits of his film Kill Bill: Volume 1. On the DVD, Gheorghe Zamfir is mistakenly credited as the title's producer.

The title enjoys unbroken popularity up to today and is newly recorded by numerous artists. A rap version by Lamar in 1999 was quite successful, as well as a version by Leo Rojas, which enabled him to win the Television talent-show Das Supertalent in December, 2011.

References

1977 songs
Instrumental solo pieces
Fictional shepherds
Songs about shepherds
Songs about loneliness
Songs with music by James Last
Compositions in D minor